Petra Novotná (née Wagnerová, born 23 February 1966) is a Czech orienteering competitor. At the 1989 World Orienteering Championships in Skövde, she won a silver medal in the relay with the Czechoslovak team. She received a bronze medal in the relay event at the 1993 World Orienteering Championships, together with Maria Honzová, Marcela Kubatková and Jana Cieslarová. In the 1995 World championships, she again received a bronze medal in relay, with the same Czech team.

She finished 16th in the short distance and 19th in the classic distance in 1991. She won the B-final in the short distance in 1993.

See also 
 Czech orienteers
 Czechoslovak orienteers
 List of orienteers
 List of orienteering events

References 

1966 births
Living people
Czech orienteers
Czechoslovak orienteers
Female orienteers
Foot orienteers
World Orienteering Championships medalists